The Granby Predateurs were a semi-professional ice hockey team in Granby, Quebec. They played in the Quebec Semi-Pro Hockey League under three different names from 1996-2004.

The club was founded in 1996 as Waterloo 94, they then changed their name to the Granby Blitz in 1997, before becoming the Predateurs in 2002.

Notable players
James Desmarais

External links
 The Internet Hockey Database

Ice hockey teams in Quebec
Ice hockey clubs established in 1997
Ice hockey clubs disestablished in 2004
Sport in Granby, Quebec
Quebec Semi-Pro Hockey League teams
1997 establishments in Quebec
2004 disestablishments in Quebec